Conservatism is a set of political philosophies that favour tradition.

Conservatism or conservative may also refer to:
 Linguistic conservatism, a language form that has changed relatively little over its history
 Conservatism (belief revision), a cognitive bias in Bayesian belief revision
 Conservative interval, a confidence interval whose actual coverage probability is greater than a desired nominal coverage probability
 Conservatism (diving), a risk averse approach to decompression practice
 Convention of conservatism, a policy in accounting of anticipating possible future losses but not future gains
 Epistemic conservatism, a view about the structure of reasons or justification for belief
 Conservative force, a physical force whose work is path-independent
 Conservative vector field, a vector field that is the gradient of some function
The Conservative, an American weekly journal published from 1898 to 1902
Conservatism: An Invitation to the Great Tradition, a 2017 book by Roger Scruton

See also
 
 
 Conservative Christianity
 Conservative movement (disambiguation)
 Conservative Party
 List of conservative parties by country
 Conservation (disambiguation)
 Conserve (disambiguation)
 Progressive Conservative (disambiguation)
 Conservative Judaism, a branch of Judaism that began in the early 1900s
 Conservative Friends, members of a certain branch of the Religious Society of Friends (Quakers)
 Traditionalist conservatism, a political philosophy emphasizing the need for the principles of natural law and transcendent moral order
 National conservatism, a variant of conservatism which concentrates more on national interests and traditional social/ethical views
 Centre-right politics